Flappers and Philosophers is the first collection of eight short stories by F. Scott Fitzgerald, published in 1920. All of the stories had been published earlier, independently, in either Saturday Evening Post, or Scribner's Magazine.

Stories 
The stories included in the collection are:

 "The Offshore Pirate"
 "The Ice Palace"
 "Head and Shoulders"
 "The Cut-Glass Bowl"
 "Bernice Bobs Her Hair"
 "Benediction"
 "Dalyrimple Goes Wrong"
 "The Four Fists"

External links 

Flappers and Philosophers. New York: Charles Scribner's Sons, 1921 (reprint). Scanned book from Internet Archive.
 
 

1920 short story collections
Short story collections by F. Scott Fitzgerald